Prahu may refer to:

 Proa, a multihull sailing vessel
 Prague, the capital of the Czech Republic; the accusative (4th form) of the Czech word Praha